Group F of the women's football tournament at the 2020 Summer Olympics was played from 21 to 27 July 2021 and included Brazil, China PR, the Netherlands and Zambia. The top two teams, the Netherlands and Brazil, advanced to the knockout stage.

Teams

Notes

Standings

In the quarter-finals,
The winners of Group F, the Netherlands, advanced to play the runners-up of Group G, the United States.
The runners-up of Group F, Brazil, advanced to play the runners-up of Group E, Canada.

Matches

China PR vs Brazil

Zambia vs Netherlands
This was the highest-scoring women's football match ever at the Olympic Games, with the Netherlands' tally of ten goals is also a women's Olympic record. It was also the highest-scoring match at the Olympics since 1928, when Italy beat Egypt 11–3 in the men's bronze medal match in Amsterdam.

China PR vs Zambia

Netherlands vs Brazil

Netherlands vs China PR

Brazil vs Zambia

Discipline
Fair play points would have been used as a tiebreaker if the overall and head-to-head records of teams were tied. These were calculated based on yellow and red cards received in all group matches as follows:
first yellow card: minus 1 point;
indirect red card (second yellow card): minus 3 points;
direct red card: minus 4 points;
yellow card and direct red card: minus 5 points;

Only one of the above deductions is applied to a player in a single match.

Notes

References

External links
Women's Olympic Football Tournament Tokyo 2020, FIFA.com

Group F